Kryzhanivka is a village in Odesa Raion of Odesa Oblast, Ukraine. It belongs to Fontanka rural hromada, one of the hromadas of Ukraine. It is apart of the M28 and M14 Highway.

Until 18 July 2020, Kryzhanivka belonged to Lyman Raion. The raion was abolished in July 2020 as part of the administrative reform of Ukraine, which reduced the number of raions of Odesa Oblast to seven. The area of Lyman Raion was merged into Odesa Raion.

See also 
Igor Uchytel

References 

Villages in Odesa Raion